
Ichigo Ichie is a Japanese kaiseki restaurant in Cork, Ireland. It was awarded a Michelin star for 2019.

The restaurant name alludes to the Japanese idiom Ichi-go ichi-e (一期一会), literally "one time, one meeting", reminding people to cherish any gathering that they may take part in, citing the fact that many meetings in life are not repeated. Even though the host and guests may see each other often socially, one day's gathering can never be repeated exactly.
The phrase “ichigo-ichie” has two parts: “ichigo” means “one life” and “ichie” means “a one-time encounter.” And so this is often translated as “This is a once-in-a-lifetime opportunity.” This phrase originated with the tea ceremony, where it expresses the feelings of the host to show sincere hospitality towards guests.

Awards
 Michelin star: since 2019

See also
List of Michelin starred restaurants in Ireland

References

External links
Official website

Culture in Cork (city)
Michelin Guide starred restaurants in Ireland
Irish companies established in 2018